Edward Kobina Acquah (23 July 1935 – 5 October 2011) was a Ghanaian footballer who played as a forward. He competed for the Ghana national team at the 1964 Summer Olympics. He also scored four goals for Ghana in the 1963 African Cup of Nations.

See also
 Football at the 1964 Summer Olympics

References

External links
 
 

1935 births
2011 deaths
Ghanaian footballers
Association football forwards
Ghana international footballers
Olympic footballers of Ghana
Footballers at the 1964 Summer Olympics
1963 African Cup of Nations players
Africa Cup of Nations-winning players
Sekondi Wise Fighters players